Juan Carlos González Zamora (born June 24, 1968) is a Cuban-born Mexican chess grandmaster. He was the fourth Mexican to be awarded the Grandmaster title by FIDE.

He has won many tournaments in Mexico and has participated in international tournaments. He is an eight-time Mexican chess champion.

External links 

 
 

Chess grandmasters
Mexican chess players
Cuban chess players
Cuban emigrants to Mexico
1968 births
Living people